Pisciforma is a suborder of mayflies in the order Ephemeroptera. There are at least 410 described species in Pisciforma.

Families
 Acanthametropodidae  (sand-dwelling mayflies)
 Ameletidae  (combmouthed minnow mayflies)
 Ametropodidae  (sand minnows)
 Arthropleidae  (flatheaded mayflies)
 Baetidae  (small minnow mayflies)
 Heptageniidae  (flatheaded mayflies)
 Isonychiidae  (brushlegged mayflies)
 Metretopodidae  (cleftfooted minnow mayflies)
 Oligoneuriidae  (brushleg mayflies)
 Pseudironidae  (crabwalker mayflies)
 Siphlonuridae  (primitive minnow mayflies)

References

Further reading

External links

 NCBI Taxonomy Browser, Pisciforma

insect suborders
Mayflies